Alta Loma, Texas (Spanish: alta—high, loma—ground), located in southwestern Galveston County, was an unincorporated area which became a part of the city of Santa Fe in 1978.

Notable residents 
 Johnny Lee - country singer, known for the hit song Lookin' for Love from the Urban Cowboy (1980) soundtrack
 Doug Hiser - artist and author of bestselling novels The Honey Bee Girl (2006) and Montana Mist (2011)

References

External links 

 

Santa Fe, Texas
Populated places in Galveston County, Texas
Greater Houston